Grawemeyer Hall is a building located on the Belknap Campus (main campus) of the University of Louisville. The building was modeled after Thomas Jefferson's Rotunda on the grounds of the University of Virginia. Named for Charles Grawemeyer, a major benefactor to the University, the building now houses mostly administrative offices including the office of the university's president.

On the steps of the building rests one of the original castings of Auguste Rodin's The Thinker. This casting is one of the few originals in the United States and the only one in the American South.

See also
University of Louisville
Louisville, Kentucky

References

University of Louisville